The 1993 United States federal budget is the United States federal budget to fund government operations for the fiscal year 1993, which was October 1992 – September 1993.  This budget was the final federal budget submitted by George H. W. Bush before he was defeated by Bill Clinton in the 1992 United States presidential election.

Receipts

(in billions of dollars)

Outlays
The total outlays for FY1993 was 1.409 trillion dollars as authorized by congress.

Deficit/Surplus
The budget had an estimated deficit for enacted legislation of $255 billion.3.8% of GDP

References

1993
1993 in American politics
United States federal budget